Cedarvale railway station is on the Canadian National Railway mainline in Cedarvale, British Columbia.  The railway station is served by Via Rail's Jasper – Prince Rupert train as a flag stop.

History
The community was originally called Minskinish and was established by Reverend R. Tomlinson in 1888 as a Victorian missionary village. The station was opened by the Grand Trunk Pacific Railway and joined by a post office across the street in 1910.  In 1988, the official registered centre of the village was moved to the opposite side of the Skeena River from the railway station. The station and town were connected by a ferry service.

Footnotes

External links 
Via Rail Station Description

Via Rail stations in British Columbia